They Say I'm a Communist (Spanish: Dicen que soy comunista) is a 1951 Mexican comedy film directed by Alejandro Galindo and starring Adalberto Martínez, María Luisa Zea and Miguel Manzano.

Cast
 Adalberto Martínez as Benito Reyes  
 María Luisa Zea as Berta  
 Miguel Manzano as Macario Carrola  
 Joaquín Roche hijo as Huicho 
 Charles Rooner as don Guillermo  
 Salvador Quiroz as Teófilo Mendieta  
 Arturo Castro 'Bigotón' as Nabor Méndez  
 Jorge Arriaga as Camarada Buenaventura 
 Manuel Dondé as Camarada Palomera  
 Bruno Márquez as Anunciador en concurso  
 Carmen Manzano as Doña Lolita  
 Josefina del Mar as Olga Figueroa  
 Jaime Jiménez Pons as Amigo de Huicho 
 Armando Acosta as Hombre en baile  
 Jorge Alzaga as Miembro del comité  
 Daniel Arroyo as Cliente restaurante  
 Augusto Benedico as Don Federico, jefe de Benito 
 Victorio Blanco as Miembro del comité  
 Lupe Carriles as Vecina  
 Enrique Carrillo as Cliente fonda
 Alfonso Carti as Policía 
 José Chávez as Hombre en baile 
 Nacho Contla as Gildardo Molina, señor gobernador  
 Enedina Díaz de León as Doña Brigida 
 Jesús Garcia as Compañero Ruiz 
 Emilio Garibay as Camarada
 Carmen Guillén as Mujer del censo  
 Leonor Gómez as Vecina  
 Chel López as Camarada Ruelas  
 Jorge Martínez de Hoyos as Miembro del comité 
 Pepe Martínez as Dueño fonda  
 Héctor Mateos as don Pablo  
 Gloria Oropeza as Vecina 
 Antonio Padilla 'Pícoro' as Miembro del comité  
 Ignacio Peón as Transeúnte 
 José Pulido as Camarada Leobardo Tolentino  
 Guillermo Ramirez as Esbirro de Guillermo  
 Ignacio Retes as Francisco Rodríguez Franco  
 Ángela Rodríguez as Mujer en concurso  
 Gilda Selva 
 Manuel Trejo Morales as Marcelo, maître d'  
 Manuel 'Loco' Valdés as Hombre en baile  
 Alfredo Varela padre as Cliente fonda  
 Hernán Vera as don Roque

References

Bibliography 
 Rogelio Agrasánchez. Cine Mexicano: Posters from the Golden Age, 1936-1956. Chronicle Books, 2001.

External links 
 

1951 films
1951 comedy films
Mexican comedy films
1950s Spanish-language films
Films directed by Alejandro Galindo
Mexican black-and-white films
1950s Mexican films